167 Regiment is a reserve regiment of the British Army's Royal Logistic Corps.

History
The regiment was formed as the Catering Support Regiment, Royal Logistic Corps in 1993.

Structure
The current structure is as follows:
111 Catering Squadron
112 Catering Squadron
113 Catering Squadron

The regiment has its headquarters and training facilities at Prince William of Gloucester Barracks in Grantham, Lincolnshire.

References

External links
 
 Army Catering Corps Association

Catering education in the United Kingdom
Education in Lincolnshire
Grantham
Military food of the United Kingdom
Military units and formations established in 1993
Organisations based in Lincolnshire
Regiments of the Royal Logistic Corps